Grant Hart Palmer (August 17, 1940 – September 25, 2017) was an American educator best known for his controversial work, An Insider's View of Mormon Origins, which ostensibly led to his disfellowshipment in 2004 from the Church of Jesus Christ of Latter-day Saints (LDS Church).

Biography

Palmer received his M.A. in American history from Brigham Young University (BYU) in 1968, writing his thesis on the Godbeite movement.  He pursued doctoral studies from 1974 to 1975, but did not complete them.  During his career Palmer was active in the Mormon History Association.

Palmer's wife died of cancer in late 1992.  He later remarried the former Connie Christensen and they lived in Sandy, Utah.  After retiring Palmer worked as a real estate developer. He died on September 25, 2017.

Career

Initially Palmer was hired to teach history at the Church College of New Zealand.  Shortly later he began teaching religion, which led to a 34-year career in the Church Educational System (CES).  He was director of the LDS Institute of Religion in Whittier, California (1970–73) followed by Chico, California (1975–80).  Returning to Utah, he then taught LDS seminary at East High School in 1980 and at Brighton High School from 1980 to 1988.

During this time the infamous Salamander Letter surfaced, challenging the orthodox story of Mormon beginnings, though the letter was eventually found to be a forgery.  As an ardent student of LDS history the letter caused Palmer to consider the influences of American folk magic on Joseph Smith's religious practices.  In 1985 Palmer's research on this issue led him to write and circulate a manuscript called "New York Mormonism" under the pseudonym "Paul Pry, Jr." which became the first draft of An Insider's View of Mormon Origins.  As he grew uneasy with some aspects of LDS history, Palmer approached his CES supervisor about changing positions to teach adults at the Salt Lake County Jail.  Teaching more general Christian and Biblical lessons of faith and ethics to all inmates, he was the jail's chaplain and director of its Institute program from 1988 until his 2001 retirement.  He also served on the board of directors of the Salt Lake Legal Defenders Association.

After completing his long-coming manuscript, he published the controversial book An Insider's View of Mormon Origins with Signature Books in 2002, in which Palmer challenged the orthodox teachings of Mormonism's beginnings. Palmer's prison teaching led him to write another book, The Incomparable Jesus, published by Greg Kofford Books in 2005.

In 2003 An Insider's View was criticized by BYU's Foundation for Ancient Research and Mormon Studies (FARMS) in reviews written by Daniel C. Peterson, Davis Bitton, Steven C. Harper, Mark Ashurst-McGee, and Louis Midgley.  These were published in the FARMS Review alongside an official statement from BYU's Joseph Fielding Smith Institute for Latter-day Saint History disagreeing with Palmer's conclusions.  In the following Review issue, historian James B. Allen published another critical review.

Church discipline and resignation 

Palmer asserts that he was disfellowshipped from the LDS Church in December 2004 as a result of his book, An Insider's View of Mormon Origins, which was skeptical of Mormonism's claimed origins (being disfellowshipped results in probational loss of some church privileges without being forced to leave the church).

Palmer concluded that while he liked many of the teachings of Joseph Smith, "the foundational events in church history are too problematic to ignore". He found that much of what Latter Day Saints take for granted as literal history has, over the years, been modified to emphasize certain aspects over others.  This, he believes, has resulted in an inaccurate picture of LDS Church history.

Palmer argues also that the 'Mormon Jesus' is very different from the current Christian Jesus due to the modern practices of the LDS Church such as tithing, avoidance of alcoholic beverages, and use of special clothing.

At the time of his disfellowshipment, Palmer stated that he still loved the church, and was pleased he was not excommunicated. He also stated that he no longer attended church meetings specifically to avoid offending other members with his opinions as well as due to his rejection of standard LDS beliefs.

In 2010, Palmer resigned his membership in the LDS Church.

Afterward 

Critics of the LDS Church, and Palmer himself, have compared the disfellowshipment of Grant Palmer to the trial of Galileo Galilei by the Roman Catholic Church.

In May 2006, a four-part interview of Grant Palmer was featured on John Dehlin's podcast Mormon Stories.  This interview was followed in January 2007 with a five-part interview of Richard Bushman, historian and author of Joseph Smith: Rough Stone Rolling, with Bushman's LDS-believing views presented in contrast to Palmer's skeptical take on Mormon origins. Palmer and Bushman were also among the wide range of people interviewed in the 2007 PBS documentary The Mormons.

In 2008 Palmer wrote an article in The Salt Lake Tribune comparing the Mormon and Catholic Churches to the Pharisees, whose observance of strict laws and oral traditions was decried by Jesus. Palmer believed that, instead, a true belief in Christian religion is centered in individually becoming good and loving people.

Palmer stated in a Mormon Stories interview in 2012 that due to the publication of a two and half page article in 2010, "Religious feeling and truth", for an obscure Baptist journal in Kansas City, a second disciplinary council was scheduled but Palmer handed in his resignation before the hearing was held. Several reasons led to his decision, mainly, that the first disciplinary council lasted an exhausting seven hours and he did not want to repeat that experience and also that the presiding authority of the second council let him know beforehand that to stay a member and avoid excommunication he would need to repudiate all of the details from his book and also regain his testimony of the church.

After learning that Palmer had terminal cancer, John Dehlin promptly announced on February 3, 2017 that the Open Stories Foundation would organize an event to celebrate the life and works of Palmer, tentatively scheduled for February 15. He died on September 25, 2017.

Publications

.

References

External links
 The Grant H. Palmer Papers housed at the University of Utah Marriott Library Special Collections
 "Links to the disfellowship of Grant Palmer"
 Commentary and numerous articles about the Palmer incident, assembled by Mel Tungate
 
 Mormon Think article about Grant H. Palmer
Multi-media
 
 
 
 

1940 births
2017 deaths
Brigham Young University alumni
Church Educational System instructors
Critics of Mormonism
Former Latter Day Saints
Place of birth missing
Historians of the Latter Day Saint movement
Mormon studies scholars
Mormonism-related controversies
People from Sandy, Utah